Bishop of Southwark may refer to:

 Anglican Bishop of Southwark, the Ordinary of the Church of England Diocese of Southwark
 Archbishop of Southwark, the Ordinary of the Roman Catholic Archdiocese of Southwark